Garandu (also Romanized as Gārāndū; also known as Gārandehū and Kārāndahū) is a village in Byaban Rural District, Byaban District, Minab County, Hormozgan Province, Iran. At the 2006 census, its population was 149, in 21 families.

References 

Populated places in Minab County